Semyonovskaya is a rural locality (a village) in Ivanovskoye Rural Settlement, Vashkinsky District, Vologda Oblast, Russia. The population was 2 as of 2002.

Geography 
The distance to Lipin Bor is 53 km, to Ivanovskaya is 2 km. Ivanovskaya  is the nearest rural locality.

References 

Rural localities in Vashkinsky District